Marco Landucci (born 25 March 1964, in Lucca) is an Italian assistant head coach for
Juventus and former footballer who played as a goalkeeper. Landucci has been assistant to manager Massimiliano Allegri since 2008.

References

1964 births
Living people
Italian footballers
Association football goalkeepers
Serie A players
Serie B players
ACF Fiorentina players
Parma Calcio 1913 players
S.S.D. Lucchese 1905 players
Brescia Calcio players
U.S. Avellino 1912 players
Venezia F.C. players
Hellas Verona F.C. players
Inter Milan players
A.C. Milan non-playing staff
Juventus F.C. non-playing staff